Ahuntsic was a former provincial electoral district in Quebec, Canada, which elected members to the National Assembly of Quebec (known as the Legislative Assembly of Quebec until December 1968). It was located in and around the Ahuntsic district of Montreal.

It was created for the 1966 election from parts of the now-defunct Laval district. Its final election was in 1970.  It disappeared in the 1973 election and its successor electoral districts were Crémazie and L'Acadie.

Members of the Legislative Assembly / National Assembly
 Jean-Paul Lefebvre, Liberal (1966–1970)
 François Cloutier, Liberal (1970–1973)

External links
Election results
 Election results (National Assembly)
 Election results (Quebecpolitique.com)

Former provincial electoral districts of Quebec